The Greatest Hits is a 2003 Lulu album charting her 40-year career in music from 1964's UK top-ten hit "Shout" through 2002's "We've Got Tonight," a UK top-five duet with Ronan Keating. It also covers everything in between, including her 1967 US  1 Hit "To Sir With Love", the 1969 Eurovision Song Contest winner "Boom Bang-a-Bang", the 1974 James Bond theme "The Man with the Golden Gun", the 1993 comeback single "Independence" and the UK No. 1 Hit "Relight My Fire" (a duet with Take That).

The album combines her UK hits such as "The Boat That I Row" and "The Man Who Sold The World", as well as her successful singles in the US like "Oh Me Oh My (I'm A Fool For You Baby)" and "I Could Never Miss You (More Than I Do)". Tracks from her 2002 album Together are also featured, including duets with Elton John and Sting. The final track, "First Of May" is a duet with her former husband Maurice Gibb, taken from her "An Audience With Lulu" ITV television special, making it the only song which debuted on the CD.

Track listing

Chart performance
 In the United Kingdom, the album debuted at No. 35 and spent 2 weeks on the UK Albums Chart.

References

2003 greatest hits albums
Lulu (singer) albums
Mercury Records compilation albums